Oddvar Berrefjord (born 20 March 1918 in Vardø, died 25 November 1999) was a Norwegian jurist and politician for the Labour Party.

He was Minister of Justice and the Police from 1971 to 1972 in the first cabinet Bratteli, and from 1980 to 1981 in the cabinet Nordli. As an elected politician he served in the position of deputy representative to the Norwegian Parliament from Telemark during the terms 1965–1969 and 1969–1973.

On the local level he was a member of Skien city council from 1945 to 1959 and 1963 to 1971, serving the last four years as deputy mayor. He was also county mayor of Telemark county from 1967 to 1971. He chaired the county party chapter from 1963 to 1968, and was a member of the national party board from 1963 to 1979. He was County Governor of Telemark from 1976 to 1987.

Outside politics Berrefjord was a jurist. He graduated as cand.jur. in 1941, and participated as a judge in the Legal purge in Norway after World War II. He later worked as a district attorney in Telemark and as a presiding judge.

References

1918 births
1999 deaths
Government ministers of Norway
Deputy members of the Storting
Labour Party (Norway) politicians
Politicians from Telemark
County governors of Norway
Politicians from Skien
Norwegian judges
Personnel of the legal purge in Norway
Ministers of Justice of Norway
People from Vardø